The 1988–89 Stanford Cardinal men's basketball team represented Stanford University as a member of the Pacific-10 Conference during the 1988–89 NCAA Division I men's basketball season.

Roster

Schedule and results

|-
!colspan=9 style=| Non-conference regular season

|-
!colspan=9 style=| Pac-10 Tournament

|-
!colspan=9 style=| NCAA Tournament

Rankings

*Both polls did not release a week 1 poll.

References

Stanford Cardinal
Stanford Cardinal men's basketball seasons
Stanford Cardinal men's basketball
Stanford Cardinal men's basketball
Stanford